Bertha Matilde Palmer (May 22, 1849 – May 5, 1918) was an American businesswoman, socialite, and philanthropist.

Early life
Born as Bertha Matilde Honoré in Louisville, Kentucky, her father was businessman Henry Hamilton Honoré. Known within the family as "Cissie", she studied in her home town and achieved a reputation as a musician, linguist, writer, politician, and administrator. Her sister, Ida Marie Honoré, was married to Frederick Dent Grant, eldest son of general and president Ulysses S. Grant.

Marriage

She married the Chicago millionaire Potter Palmer in 1870. She was 21 and he was 44. Palmer was a Quaker merchant who had come to Chicago after failing twice in business.

In Chicago, he learned to please his customers, many of whom were women. He made customer service a priority and carried everything from dry goods to the latest French fashions for ladies. Palmer sold his vast store to a consortium, and it would eventually become Marshall Field's. Palmer then opened a luxury hotel, Palmer House, and invested in real estate, eventually owning a vast portfolio of properties.

Soon after their marriage, the Chicago Fire wiped out the Palmer House and most of their holdings, and Bertha Palmer had to rush off to wire the east so that Palmer could re-establish credit, borrow money and rebuild his holdings. Bertha Palmer was unusually poised for one so young, and together, the Palmers re-established their fortune. Despite her age, she quickly rose to the top of Chicago society. "She was beautiful, dashing, quick, and smart; and more than that, she was sure of herself," wrote historian Ernest Poole.

In 1874, she gave birth to son Honoré, and in 1875, she gave birth to son Potter Palmer II. Both sons went on to have sons named Potter Palmer III, as well as other children. See Who's Who in Chicago (1931).

She was an early member of the Chicago Woman's Club, part of the General Federation of Women's Clubs; this group of working women met to discuss social problems and develop solutions. They supported kindergartens until the city made them part of the school system, and campaigned for inexpensive milk for impoverished children and better care for children of imprisoned mothers.

Chicago World's Fair and The Women's Building
Chicago was site of the World's Columbian Exposition in 1893, a celebration of the discovery of the New World by Columbus. It also marked the city's recovery from the Great Chicago Fire of 1871. Women had a large presence in the fair and the plum position was the President of the Board of Lady Managers, which Bertha Palmer was selected to lead in 1891. While the positions were honorary, the women had a great deal of work to do. The board chose Sophia Hayden as architect for The Woman's Building and designer to supervise the interior decoration. However, when Hayden wouldn't take Palmer's advice to accept rich women's donations of architectural odds and ends to decorate the exterior, fearing a horrible visual impact as a result, Palmer fired Hayden and hired the much more malleable Candace Wheeler to supervise the interior decoration. The Chicago art curator Sarah Tyson Hallowell (1846–1924) worked closely with Palmer on the art exhibits and the murals. Apparently, it was Palmer who chose the theme of "Primitive Woman" and "Modern Woman" for the two murals and Hallowell and Palmer's first choice for both murals was Elizabeth Jane Gardner (1837–1922), an experienced academic painter and the paramour of William-Adolphe Bouguereau (1825–1905). However, the time to paint the two huge murals (12' x 54') was short and the artist did not feel that she had the energy to complete the project. Hallowell then recommended the young academic painter Mary Fairchild MacMonnies and the Impressionist painter Mary Cassatt to do the two murals and after their initial rejection of the contracts, the women only had a number of months to complete the murals and have them shipped to Chicago. Led by Palmer, who approached Congress on the matter, the board also requested that the mint produce a new commemorative coin for the Exposition, and their efforts resulted in the Isabella quarter. Following the opening of the Exposition, Palmer sat for the fashionable Swedish painter Anders Zorn (1860–1920), who was commissioned by the Board of Lady Managers from the fair.  Relative to Ms. Palmer's Inclusivity:  (CNN: 2021)  "That year (World Fair), for the very first time, a group of White women managed to obtain the space and funds for a "Women's Building" to showcase American women's achievements from the past century. 

According to at least one legend, Palmer helped invent the chocolate brownie when she directed that her kitchen staff come up with a confection smaller than a piece of cake for women attending the Columbian Exposition.

Art collecting
At the time of the fair, the Palmers had been enthusiastic art collectors for a number of years. They depended on the curator Sarah Hallowell, a Philadelphia Quaker who they had met in 1873, for advice and she introduced the Palmers to the painters in Paris and to the latest artistic trends in the French capital. Most Midwestern collectors were still collecting works by the Barbizon School in the 1870s and 1880s, but thanks to the Palmers, this would soon change. In the years leading up to the Columbian Exposition, they became clients of the Parisian dealer Paul Durand-Ruel and began to collect French Impressionist works. Because Hallowell was curating a loan exhibition of the latest French art for the exposition, the Palmers accelerated their collecting because the curator wanted the latest and greatest in French art for the fair. Palmer's collection of Impressionist paintings was unrivaled, soon they had twenty-nine Monets and eleven Renoirs, nine of the Monets were from the Haystacks series, painted 1890-91. These works now form the core of the Art Institute of Chicago's Impressionist collection. Hallowell also tried to get the Palmers interested in Auguste Rodin's work, which he had loaned her for the fair. The frankness of his nudes had caused a stir at the fair and after resisting for a number of months, works by Rodin entered the collection as well and these were among the first acquired by American collectors. Bertha Palmer enjoyed her role as a cultural leader and tastemaker. In 1905, Hallowell finally convinced Mrs. Palmer to sit for Rodin.

Luxurious mansions and lavish spending

Bertha Palmer was famous for her free-spending ways. Her husband indulged her and did not mind that she was in the limelight. Her jewelry was legendary. According to the author Aline B. Saarinen,
so fabulous were her jewels that a newspaper declared that when she appeared on the S.S. Kaiser Wilhelm der Grosse with a tiara of diamonds as large as lima beans, a corsage panned with diamonds, a sunburst as big as a baseball, a stomacher of diamonds and all the pearls around her neck, Alois Burgskeller of the Metropolitan Opera, who was singing at the ship's concert, was stopped right in the middle of a high note.
She traveled throughout Europe, dining with kings and queens and mixing with industrialists and statesmen.

Vast sums were spent on the Palmer Mansion in Chicago, starting with $100,000 and rising over $1 million. Potter Palmer dictated in his will that a sum of money should go to whoever next married Bertha. When asked why he would be so generous to his own replacement, he replied, "Because he'll need it."

She also maintained homes in London and Paris and, following her husband's death in 1902, rumors abounded that she would marry a titled man. Among the suspected suitors were the earl of Munster, the duke of Atholl, the prince of Monaco, and the king of Serbia. However, these rumors all proved to be unfounded when she remained unmarried.

In September 1907, Bertha Palmer and her son Potter II took part in the maiden voyage of the new Cunard liner RMS Lusitania from Liverpool to New York.

Florida real estate pioneer
Bertha Palmer became interested in the winter climate of Florida and in 1910 bought over 80,000  acres of land in and around Sarasota, Florida—about one-third of the land in what was then the massive county named Manatee. In 1914, she bought  of land as an exclusive hunting preserve called "River Hills" in Temple Terrace, Florida. After her death, her sons inherited the land and eventually sold it to developers who created the Mediterranean Revival golf course community of Temple Terrace, Florida.

She became a progressive rancher, land developer, and farm developer who introduced many innovations to encourage the Florida ranching, citrus, dairy, and farming industries. Palmer was one of the first famous people to winter in Florida, beginning a now-common practice. She encouraged wealthy friends and associates in her international social circles to spend winters along Sarasota Bay and her other Florida land interests and promoted the development of many land parcels; today much of that land is still known as Palmer Ranch. The major roads through her property, as well as some connecting to the existing communities, were named by her. Those names remain unchanged as Honoré, Lockwood Ridge, Tuttle, Webber, and Macintosh.

She proved herself to be an astute businesswoman: within sixteen years after her husband's death, she managed to double the value of the estate he had left her. After her death, a large parcel of her land was donated (donated according to Sarasota County, sold according to the state) by her sons to become Myakka River State Park.
Her grandson Potter D'Orsay Palmer (1908-39) became a notorious playboy who married 4 times and died after a brawl in Sarasota. His and Bertha's legacy are recounted in Frank A Cassell's book Suncoast Empire.

Death
Palmer died on May 5, 1918, at her winter residence, The Oaks in Osprey, Florida. Her body was returned to Chicago to lie in state at the Castle, the sumptuous mansion Potter Palmer had built on Chicago's Gold Coast. Bertha Palmer is buried alongside her husband in Graceland Cemetery.

Documentary project
On March 24, 2013, the half-hour documentary Love Under Fire: The Story of Bertha and Potter Palmer aired on PBS affiliate WTTW11 Chicago. The film was written, directed and produced by Amelia Dellos and Corn Bred Films.

References

Book, thesis and essay references
David Nolan, Fifty Feet in Paradise: The Booming of Florida. Harcourt Brace Jovanovich, 1984.
Sally Webster,Eve's Daughter/Modern Woman: A Mural by Mary Cassatt, University of Illinois Press, 2004
Letters in the Musee Rodin, Paris between Sarah Tyson Hallowell and Rodin, also between Bertha Palmer and Rodin
Aline Saarinen, Proud Possessors, Conde Nast, 1958
Jeffrey Morseburg, The Indefatigable Miss Hallowell, Biographical Essay, 2010
Kirsten M. Jensen, Her Sex Was an Insuperable Objection: Sara Tyson Hallowell and the Art Institute of Chicago, MA Thesis, Southern Connecticut State University, 2000
Hope Black, Mounted on a Pedestal:Bertha Honoré Palmer, Master's Thesis, University of South Florida, 2007
Ishbel Ross,Silhouette of Diamonds: The Life of Mrs. Potter Palmer,1984

External links

 Bertha Honoré Palmer at Chicago History Museum Digital Collections
 Bertha Honoré Palmer in Sarasota County Biographies
 Biographical Sketch
 Love Under Fire: The Story of Bertha and Potter Palmer 2013 documentary film

1849 births
1918 deaths
Georgetown Visitation Preparatory School alumni
Businesspeople from Chicago
Businesspeople from Louisville, Kentucky
American art collectors
Burials at Graceland Cemetery (Chicago)
19th-century American businesspeople
20th-century American businesspeople